The Instituto Superior de Tecnologia em Ciências da Computação do Rio de Janeiro (Superior Institute of Technology in Computer Science of  Rio de Janeiro - IST-Rio)  is a technological university maintained by the FAETEC. IST-Rio is one of the newest and innovative universities of technology of Brazil, using new teaching methodology determined "Escola Mandala" associated with the use of material from the latest technologies.  As a result, the IST-Rio won the eighth best rating (IGC) of Brazil in ENADE in 2008, when we evaluated courses in computing, being still second in the state of Rio de Janeiro, only behind the IME.

External links 
 IST-Rio Official website

See also

Brazil University Rankings
Universities and Higher Education in Brazil

Universities and colleges in Rio de Janeiro (city)
Educational institutions established in 2002
2002 establishments in Brazil
State universities and colleges in Brazil